Matthias Schoenaerts (born 8 December 1977) is a Belgian actor. He made his film debut at the age of 13 in Daens (1992), which was nominated for the Academy Award for Best Foreign Language Film. He is best known for his roles as Filip in Loft (2008), Jacky Vanmarsenille in the Oscar-nominated Bullhead (2011), Ali in the BAFTA and Golden Globe-nominee Rust and Bone (2012), for which he won the César Award for Most Promising Actor, Eric Deeds in The Drop (2014), Bruno von Falk in Suite Française (2015), Gabriel Oak in Far from the Madding Crowd (2015), Hans Axgil in The Danish Girl (2015) and Uncle Vanya in Red Sparrow (2018). Schoenaerts received critical acclaim for his portrayal of an ex-soldier suffering from PTSD in Disorder (2015), and for his performance as an inmate training a wild horse in The Mustang (2019).

In 2015, he was named Knight of the Order of Arts and Letters in France.

Early life
Schoenaerts was born in Antwerp, Flanders, the Dutch speaking region of Belgium. He is the son of actor Julien Schoenaerts (1925–2006) and Dominique Wiche (1953–2016), a costume designer, translator and French teacher. He has an older half brother, Bruno Schoenaerts (born 1953), who is a lawyer. Schoenaerts is of Flemish descent through his father, although his maternal grandmother is from Liège, Wallonia, the French-speaking region of Belgium, and for the first six years of his life he lived with his maternal grandparents in Brussels.

Schoenaerts grew up bilingual, speaking Dutch and French. He is also fluent in English, which he learned by watching American movies.

In 1987, at nine years old, he appeared in a stage production of Antoine de Saint-Exupéry's The Little Prince opposite his father, who was also the director. His mother, Dominique, was the costume designer of the play.

He started producing graffiti as a teenager under the pseudonym "Zenith", going to New York to collaborate with the Bronx group TATS CRU.

Schoenaerts was close to becoming a professional association football player and was on the books of Belgian team Beerschot AC, but gave up when he was 16 years old. In 2013, Schoenaerts stated that he was a fan of the Spanish football club FC Barcelona.

Career

Early work in Belgium and Netherlands (1992–2011)
At the age of 13, Schoenaerts made his film debut with a small role in the 1992 Belgian film Daens, which was nominated for the Academy Award for Best Foreign Language Film. His father starred in the film but they did not share any scenes together.

In 2003, Schoenaerts was named one of "Europe's Shooting Stars" by the European Film Promotion.

After completing studies at The Academy of Dramatic Arts in Antwerp, he featured in several shorts and feature films. In 2002, he starred in Dorothée Van Den Berghe's Meisje (Girl); Tom Barman's Any Way the Wind Blows in 2003; Rudolf Mestdagh's Ellektra and Roel Mondelaers and Raf Reyntjens's sci-fi short film A Message from Outer Space, which Schoenaerts also produced in 2004.

In 2006, Schoenaerts played Dennis in Hilde Van Mieghem's Love Belongs to Everyone, and had a small role as a member of the Dutch resistance in Paul Verhoeven's Black Book.

In 2007, he starred in Ben van Lieshout's film De Muze, and in Erik Bruyn's Nadine. In 2008, he played Bob in Pieter van Hees's horror film Left Bank, and most notably played the role of Filip in Erik Van Looy's Loft, which became the most successful Flemish film at the Belgian box-office, earning over $7,075,161. In the same year, Schoenaerts starred in the mini-series The Emperor of Taste (De smaak van De Keyser), playing a Belgian soldier in World War II.

In 2009, he starred in Dorothée Van Den Berghe's My Queen Karo, in which he played the hippie Raven in 1970s' Amsterdam. In 2010, he played the lead role in Alex Stockman's techno-thriller Pulsar, and had a cameo in Franck Richard's La Meute (The Pack).

In 2011, Schoenaerts starred in the Dutch films The Gang of Oss (De Bende van Oss) and The President (De President).

Breakthrough: Bullhead and Rust and Bone (2011–2013)
In 2011, Schoenaerts played Jacky Vanmarsenille, the lead role in Bullhead, directed by Michaël R. Roskam, which was nominated for the Best Foreign Language Oscar. His performance in the film was well received and won him the FIPRESCI Award for best actor at the Palm Springs International Film Festival in January 2012. The jury praised the actor's "superb portrayal of an innocent and sensitive man trapped in a truculent body." He also won the Magritte Award for Best Actor.

In 2012, he starred in Jacques Audiard's Rust and Bone (De rouille et d'os) alongside Marion Cotillard. The film premiered at the 2012 Cannes Film Festival and was a critical and box office hit in France. On 22 February 2013, Matthias won the César Award for Most Promising Actor for his role in Rust and Bone.

Schoenaerts produced and starred in the Belgian short film Death of a Shadow (Dood van een Schaduw), directed by Tom Van Avermaet. On 10 January 2013, the short film was nominated for the Academy Award for Best Live Action Short Film.

The New York Times described Schoenaerts as "the most versatile beefcake actor of our time" in 2012.

In 2013, he narrated the Flemish version of the Disneynature documentary Chimpanzee.

International success (2014-Present)
In 2014, Schoenaerts appeared alongside Clive Owen, Billy Crudup and again Marion Cotillard in the thriller Blood Ties, in which he played Anthony Scarfo. The film premiered at the 2013 Cannes Film Festival.

He played Eric Deeds in The Drop, his second film with Michael R. Roskam, starring opposite Tom Hardy, Noomi Rapace and James Gandolfini.

In 2015, Schoenaerts appeared in seven films: The Loft, the American remake of the Belgian film Loft, in which he played the same character and which was his first English-language film; in Saul Dibb's Suite Française, playing the German officer Bruno von Falk opposite Michelle Williams and Kristin Scott Thomas; in Thomas Vinterberg's Far from the Madding Crowd as Gabriel Oak, one of Carey Mulligan's three love interests; in Alan Rickman's period drama A Little Chaos, as French landscape architect André Le Nôtre, opposite Kate Winslet. In the same year, Schoenaerts was announced as William Clark on HBO's miniseries Lewis and Clark, co-starring Casey Affleck as Meriwether Lewis. Production got shut down in August 2015 due to "internal and external, weather-related factors".

Schoenaerts starred in Alice Winocour's French thriller Disorder (Maryland), as an ex-soldier suffering from post traumatic stress disorder, for which his performance was highly praised. He played Paul in Luca Guadagnino's erotic thriller A Bigger Splash, starring opposite Tilda Swinton, Ralph Fiennes and Dakota Johnson, and played the art-dealer Hans Axgil in Tom Hooper's The Danish Girl. A Bigger Splash and The Danish Girl made their world premieres at the 2015 Venice Film Festival, both were screened in the official competition.

On 28 July 2015, Schoenaerts was named a Knight of the Order of Arts and Letters in France.

In January 2016, it was announced that Schoenaerts would play a drummer who begins to lose his hearing in Darius Marder's Sound of Metal. After a couple of years in development, Schoenaerts was replaced by Riz Ahmed.

In 2017, Schoenaerts reteamed with Michaël R. Roskam in the Belgian film Racer and the Jailbird (Le Fidèle), in the role of a gangster named Gigi. The film was Roskam and Schoenaerts' first film in Belgium since 2011's Bullhead. In the same year, Schoenaerts played Gene, Jane Fonda's son on the Netflix film Our Souls at Night, also starring Robert Redford and directed by Ritesh Batra.

He worked again with director Thomas Vinterberg in 2018's Kursk, a film about the Kursk submarine disaster of 2000 in which Schoenaerts played Russian Navy captain-lieutenant Mikhail Kalekov.

In 2018, Schoenaerts co-starred in Francis Lawrence's spy thriller Red Sparrow in the role of Uncle Vanya opposite Jennifer Lawrence, Joel Edgerton and Jeremy Irons. He starred in the Belgian-French film Close Enemies, directed by David Oelhoffen.

In 2019, Schoenaerts appeared as Captain Herder in Terrence Malick's A Hidden Life, as Maywood in Steven Soderbergh's The Laundromat, and as Roman Coleman, an inmate who participates in a rehabilitation program centered around training of wild horses in Laure de Clermont-Tonnerre's The Mustang. In 2020, he appeared in Gina Prince-Bythewood's The Old Guard as Booker / Sébastien le Livre, once a French soldier who fought under Napoleon.

In 2021, Schoenaerts starred as Peter Flood in Jeremie Guez's Brothers by Blood and as Jurgen in the Flemish TV anthology Lockdown episode "Zuur" alongside Veerle Baetens. His upcoming works include Terrence Malick's The Way of the Wind, Justin Kurzel's Ruin alongside Margot Robbie, and David O. Russell's Amsterdam. He will star as the title character in the upcoming TV series Django.

Other ventures
Schoenaerts was the face of Louis Vuitton Menswear Spring/Summer 2014.

Directorial debut
His directorial debut, Franky, is a documentary about a one-legged childhood friend of his who became an MMA fighter, Franky van Hove. The documentary is currently in post-production.

Hakuna Casting
On 24 August 2015, it was reported that Schoenaerts became the co-owner of the Belgian casting agency Hakuna Casting, which focuses on people of ethnic origin.

The agency has collaborated on the casting of films like Black by Adil El Arbi and Bilall Fallah, and Belgica by Felix Van Groeningen.

Filmography

Film

Television

Awards and nominations

References

External links

 
 
 
 
 
 

1977 births
Living people
Belgian male film actors
Belgian film producers
Belgian graffiti artists
Actors from Antwerp
Magritte Award winners
Most Promising Actor César Award winners
20th-century Belgian male actors
21st-century Belgian male actors
Belgian male television actors
Flemish male actors
Flemish male film actors
Flemish people of Walloon descent
20th-century Flemish male actors
21st-century Flemish male actors
Flemish male television actors
Chevaliers of the Ordre des Arts et des Lettres
Mass media people from Antwerp